Veli-Matti Savinainen (born 5 January 1986) is a Finnish professional ice hockey forward who currently plays for Jokerit of the Kontinental Hockey League (KHL).

Playing career
Savinainen has previously played for the Liiga clubs, Ässät and Tappara, and for HC Ugra, Torpedo Nizhny Novgorod of the Russian KHL, as well as Leksands IF of the Swedish Hockey League (SHL). He Joined Leksands IF on a one-year contract on 30 August 2014 after spending the 2013–14 season with Ugra.

After completing his second stint with HC Yugra following the 2017–18 season, posting 17 points in 50 games, Savinainen left as a free agent but opted to continue in the KHL, in joining Chinese outfit Kunlun Red Star on a one-year contract on May 2, 2018.

Following his lone season in China in the 2018–19 season, Savinainen returned to Finland to continue in the KHL, signing a two-year contract Jokerit on May 4, 2019.

International play

Savinainen was named to the Finland men's national ice hockey team for competition at the 2014 IIHF World Championship.

Career statistics

Regular season and playoffs

International

References

External links

1986 births
Living people
Ässät players
Finnish ice hockey forwards
FoPS players
Leksands IF players
Finnish expatriate ice hockey players in China
Finnish expatriate ice hockey players in Russia
Finnish expatriate ice hockey players in Sweden
Jokerit players
KooKoo players
HC Kunlun Red Star players
Ice hockey players at the 2018 Winter Olympics
Olympic ice hockey players of Finland
Sportspeople from Espoo
Tappara players
Torpedo Nizhny Novgorod players
HC Yugra players